Passion Sunday is the fifth Sunday of Lent, marking the beginning of Passiontide. In 1969, the Roman Catholic Church removed Passiontide from the liturgical year of the Novus Ordo, but it is still observed in the Extraordinary Form, the Personal Ordinariates, and by some Anglicans and Lutherans.

In Scotland, the day is known as Care Sunday.

Fifth Sunday of Lent

Until 1959, the fifth Sunday of Lent was officially known in the Roman Catholic Church as Passion Sunday. It marked the beginning of a two-week-long period known as Passiontide, which is still observed by Catholics who attend the Extraordinary Form or Catholics of the Anglican Ordinariate, Western Rite Orthodoxy, various denominations in Protestantism. 

In 1960, Pope John XXIII's Code of Rubrics changed the name for that Sunday to "First Sunday of the Passion" bringing the name into harmony with the name that Pope Pius XII gave, five years earlier, to the sixth Sunday of Lent, "Second Sunday of the Passion or Palm Sunday".

Pope Paul VI's revision in 1969 removed a distinction that existed (although with overlap) between Lent and Passiontide, which began with the fifth Sunday of Lent. The distinction, explicit in the 1960 Code of Rubrics, predates it. He removed from the fifth Sunday of Lent the reference to the Passion.

Although Passiontide as a distinct liturgical season was thus abolished, the Roman Rite liturgy continues to bring the Passion of Christ to mind, from Monday of the fifth week of Lent onward, through the choice of hymns, the use on the weekdays of the fifth week of Lent of Preface I of the Passion of the Lord, with Preface II of the Passion of the Lord being used on the first three weekdays of Holy Week, and the authorization of the practice of covering crosses and images from the fifth Sunday of Lent onward, if the Conference of Bishops so decides. Where this practice is followed, crucifixes remain covered until the end of the Good Friday celebration of the Lord's Passion; statues remain covered until the beginning of the Easter Vigil.

The entrance antiphon of the Mass on the fifth Sunday of Lent begins with the word "Iudica" (older spelling, "Judica"). This provides another name for that Sunday: "Iudica Sunday" or "Judica Sunday", similar to the name "Laetare Sunday" for the fourth Sunday. Because of the custom of veiling crucifixes and statues in the church before Mass on the fifth Sunday of Lent, this Sunday was called Black Sunday in Germany, where the veils, which elsewhere were generally violet, were of black colour.

Those who continue to observe earlier forms of the Roman Rite or of liturgies modelled on it refer to the fifth Sunday of Lent by one or other of its previous names.

Anglican usage

In those Anglican churches which follow the Sarum Use, crimson vestments and hangings are pressed into service on the fifth Sunday of Lent – replacing the Lenten array (unbleached muslin cloth) – and vestments are crimson until (and including) Holy Saturday. Reflecting the recent shift away from the observance of Passiontide as a distinct season, the Church of England's Common Worship liturgical resources suggest red for Holy Week only (with the exception of the Maundy Thursday Eucharist).

Lutheran readings

The historical readings for the fifth Sunday of Lent in the Lutheran tradition are Genesis 12:1–3, Hebrews 9:11–15, John 8:46–59, and Psalm 43. I Corinthians 1:21–31 and Matthew 26:17–29 are alternate readings.

The three-year lectionary appoints the following readings for the fifth Sunday of Lent:

Psalm
A: 116:1–9
B: 51:10–15
C: 28:1–9
1st Lesson
A: Ezekiel 37:1–14
B: Jeremiah 31:31–34
C: Isaiah 43:16–21
2nd Lesson
A: Romans 8:11–19
B: Hebrews 5:7–9
C: Philippians 3:8–14
Gospel
A: John 11:47-53/1-53
B: John 12:20–33
C: Luke 20:9–19

Methodist usage
In traditional Methodist usage, Passion Sunday was the fifth Sunday of Lent, as noted in The Book of Worship for Church and Home (1965). The Collect for Passion Sunday read as follows:

The lectionary of the same liturgical text appointed the Old Testament reading as being Gen. 22:1–2, 9–13; the Epistle as being Heb. 9:11–14; the Gospel as being John 11:47–53.

Sixth Sunday of Lent

In the Roman Rite the name "Passion Sunday" has never been officially applied to the sixth Sunday of Lent in spite of the reading at the Mass of that day of an account in one of the Synoptic Gospels of the Passion of Christ.

Until 1954, the name of the sixth Sunday of Lent was "Palm Sunday". In 1955, the name became, for 15 years only, "Second Sunday of the Passion or Palm Sunday". In 1970, it became "Palm Sunday of the Passion of the Lord".

The sixth Sunday of Lent has thus never officially been given the exact name "Passion Sunday" and the term "Palm Sunday" is given first place in its present official name.

Food
In the north of England and parts of Scotland, it is a tradition to eat carlin peas on this day.

References

Lent
Catholic liturgy
Christian Sunday observances
March observances
April observances